Natural Pier Bridge is a steel Warren through truss bridge spanning the Clark Fork river located  west of Alberton, Montana, United States, which incorporates a natural rock outcrop as anchorage for a pier.  It was nominated to the National Register of Historic Places as part of a related group of historic Montana bridges known as Montana's Historic Steel Truss Bridges and achieved listing on January 4, 2010.  Built in 1917 by the Lord Construction Company of Missoula, Montana, it is one of only a few remaining bridges of its type in the state, and of those it is the only one that incorporates a natural feature in its design.

References
Notes

Bibliography
"National Register Information System", National Register of Historic Places, National Park Service. Retrieved November 17, 2013.
Axline, Jon; Montana Department of Transportation, "Montana's Historic Steel Truss Bridges - Natural Pier Bridge", Montana Memory Project, National Park Service. Retrieved November 17, 2013.

National Register of Historic Places in Mineral County, Montana
Road bridges on the National Register of Historic Places in Montana
Steel bridges in the United States
Warren truss bridges in the United States
1917 establishments in Montana
Transportation in Mineral County, Montana